Spyken is an upper secondary school (gymnasieskola) in Lund, Sweden.

History
The school was founded in 1848 as Realskolan and had a capacity of 15 students. The number of students increased gradually up to 50. In 1898 Johannes Strömberg became principal and during his time, the capacity of the school expanded greatly with new rooms, allowing more than 750 students. In 1968, the school was turned into a public school and changed its name again to  after the former principal. The latest name change occurred in 1986, this time to its current name: Spyken. In this year, the school also had an addition of three annexes, the C-, D- and E-houses.

The name
There are different theories of where the name (which is gibberish in Swedish) comes from. One is that a teacher always accidentally called psychology . Another is that it was a nickname for a former principal. It is possible that it is a combination of both. The school was called Spyken for a long time in popular parlance before it became the official name.

Today
Today, roughly 1,100 students attend the school, which has 120 employees.

Spyxet
Every year, the students of Spyken arrange a Spex, called Spyxet.
A list of recent Spyx'
2016 
2015 Bloody Mary
2014 
2013 Jack Rackham
2012 
2011 Ramses II
2010 
2009 
2008 
2007 
2006 The Rat Pack
2005 
2004 
2003 Anno 1189
2002 
2001 
2000 
1999 Don Quijote
1998 
1997 Anno 1789
1996 
1995 
1994 
1993 

Gymnasiums (school) in Sweden
Buildings and structures in Lund